The 1996–97 Navy Midshipmen men's basketball team represented the United States Naval Academy during the 1996–97 NCAA Division I men's basketball season. The Midshipmen were led by first-year head coach Pete Herrmann, and played their home games at Alumni Hall in Annapolis, Maryland as members of the Patriot League.

Roster

Schedule and results

|-
!colspan=9 style=| Non Conference Regular season

|-
!colspan=9 style=|  Conference Regular Season 

|-
!colspan=9 style=| Patriot League tournament

|-
!colspan=9 style=| NCAA tournament

Source,

References

Navy Midshipmen
Navy
Navy Midshipmen men's basketball seasons
Navy
Navy